Duncan Victor Norbury (3 August 1887 – 23 October 1972) was an English all-round sportsman, who played football for Southampton and first-class cricket for Hampshire and Lancashire.

Cricket career
He made his first-class debut for Hampshire in a County Championship at New Road, Worcester in June 1905. He appeared regularly for Hampshire that summer, and twice in 1906, making a total of eleven appearances, scoring a total of 179 runs.

Between 1909 and 1913, he played minor counties cricket with Northumberland, making 24 appearances in total and establishing a reputation as a reliable opening batsman and slow right-arm bowler. From 1912 onwards, Norbury also played for East Lancashire as a professional, claiming over 100 wickets for the 1912 and 1913 seasons.

After the First World War, he joined Lancashire for whom he made eight appearances in 1919. In a match against Surrey, Norbury scored his only first-class century when he scored exactly 100 runs in a drawn match. Whilst on the books of the county club, he continued to turn out for East Lancashire in the Lancashire League until 1924.

His next county championship appearances came for Lancashire in 1922, when he made a further six appearances. His swan song as a professional cricketer came in 1935, when he played for Sir Lindsay Parkinson's XI against Leicestershire.

Football career

Norbury was born in Bartley on the eastern edge of the New Forest. His youth football was played for the village team and later for Brockenhurst, from where he joined Southampton in 1905. Norbury spent most of his football career in the reserves, but made his debut for the first team as a replacement at left-back for Horace Glover away to Brentford on 29 September 1906. Norbury retained his place for the next match, in a 5–1 victory at home to Millwall. This was the "Saints" first win of the season (having managed only two draws in the first five matches); despite this, Norbury lost his place back to Glover and made only one further first-team appearance, taking over from Jack Eastham at right-back at home to Clapton Orient on 16 February 1907.

In the summer of 1907, he turned out for his local village team, Bartley Cross, but broke his leg, thus preventing him from playing cricket that summer.

Personal life
Norbury's brother-in-law, Henry Smoker, also played cricket for Hampshire and football for Southampton. Victor served as a lieutenant in the East Lancashire Regiment and South Lancashire Regiment during the First World War.

References

External links
Profile on cricketarchive
Profile on cricinfo

1887 births
1972 deaths
People from New Forest District
English cricketers
Hampshire cricketers
Lancashire cricketers
Northumberland cricketers
English footballers
Brockenhurst F.C. players
Southampton F.C. players
Southern Football League players
Association football central defenders
British Army personnel of World War I
East Lancashire Regiment officers
South Lancashire Regiment officers
Military personnel from Hampshire